Malekabad (also Romanized as Malekābād; also known as Malekābād-e Āstāneh) is a village in Astaneh Rural District, in the Central District of Roshtkhar County, Razavi Khorasan Province, Iran. At the 2006 census, its population was 1,399, in 321 families.

References 

Populated places in Roshtkhar County